Shepard Steamship Company of Boston, Massachusetts was founded in 1930 by Otis N Shepard, and H B, Shepard with service from Pacific Coast to Philadelphia, New York City, Albany and Boston. Service was called the Shepard Line Shepard Steamship Company moved to 21 West Street, New York City in 1947. The Shepard Steamship Company's main cargo was lumber products. Otis N Shepard company, Otis Shepard & Co.  partnered with George H. Morse in 1868 to form Shepard & Morse Lumber Company of Burlington, Vermont.  During World War II the Shepard Steamship Company was active in charter shipping  with the Maritime Commission and War Shipping Administration. During wartime, the Shepard Steamship Company operated Victory ships and Liberty shipss. The ship was run by its crew and the US Navy supplied United States Navy Armed Guards to man the deck guns and radio. The most common armament mounted on these merchant ships were the MK II 20mm Oerlikon autocannon and the 3"/50, 4"/50, and 5"/38 deck guns.

Ships

SS Harpoon,  was SS Hopatcong built in 1920, became Empire Tarpon 1940 
SS Sea Thrush, built in 1920, sank by U-505 June 28, 1942 off Bahamas
SS Timber Rush, was City of Eureka from 1925 to 1928, built in 1919, sank in 1940 off Acapulco   
SS Sage Brush, sank as SS Keystone in 1943, a 1919 5,565 tons, cargo ship
SS Exporter, was USS Hercules, a 1939 cargo ship
SS Wind Rush, was SS Westbrook built in 1918 by Columbia River SB, ablaze in the Caribbean Dec. 21 1939, repaired, became Kavkaz in 1945, and scrapped 1977 
SS  Wind Rush (2), was SS Lloyd S. Carlson Liberty ship, built in 1945
SS Exford built in 1919

World War II Ships
Ships operated under charter during and just after World War II: 

Victory ships:
La Grande Victory  (troopship) 
Binghampton Victory
N. Y. U. Victory 
 Liberty ships:
Theodore Foster
Warren P. Marks 
Edwin Abbey
Segundo Ruiz-Belvis
John A. Dix
John P. Harris
George E. Waldo
George H. Himes
George M. Cohan
Lot Whitcomb
Charles H. Lanham  (Mashal plan ship)
Clarence F. Peck
Robert D. Carey
For Korean War:
Harpoon  (1950 to 1954) (was Ward Hunt)

References 

Transport companies established in 1930
American companies established in 1930
1930 establishments in Massachusetts